Jake Orrell (born 17 July 1997) is an English footballer who plays for Consett.

Career

Gateshead
Orrell began his career at Sunderland's youth academy before joining Gateshead in January 2015. He made six substitute appearances for Gateshead towards the end of the 2014–15 season.

Chesterfield
He went on trial at Chesterfield in the summer of 2015 and was successful in earning a professional contract. He made his Chesterfield debut on 11 August 2015 in a 3–1 League Cup defeat against Carlisle United. On 22 January 2016, Orrell went on loan to Matlock Town and made his debut the following day as a substitute in a 2–1 win over Hyde United. His loan was extended for a further month in February before being recalled by Chesterfield on 17 March. On 28 March 2016, Orrell made his Football League debut as an 83rd-minute substitute in Chesterfield's 1–0 defeat at Oldham Athletic.

Hartlepool United
On 7 June 2016 Orrell joined Hartlepool United on a free transfer. Orell was loaned out to Spennymoor Town in one month on 17 February 2017. The deal got cancelled on 1 March 2017 after issues with FA clearance.

Spennymoor
However, he joined Spennymoor in July, but got his contract terminated by mutual consent on 25 October 2017.

Blyth Spartans
On 5 June 2019, Orrell joined Blyth Spartans.

Consett
He left the club on 27 September 2019, and two days later, he signed for Consett AFC.

Career statistics

References

External links

1997 births
Living people
English footballers
Sunderland A.F.C. players
Gateshead F.C. players
Chesterfield F.C. players
Matlock Town F.C. players
Hartlepool United F.C. players
Spennymoor Town F.C. players
Newcastle Benfield F.C. players
Blyth Spartans A.F.C. players
Consett A.F.C. players
National League (English football) players
Northern Premier League players
Association football forwards